Good God's Urge is the second studio album by American alternative rock band Porno for Pyros. It was released in 1996 on Warner Bros. It was the band's first album to feature bass guitarist Mike Watt, who assisted the band in finishing the album after Martyn LeNoble left before all his bass tracks had been completed. There were three singles released from the album.

In addition to Watt, many guest musicians lent their musical talents to various songs. "Porpoise Head" featured Daniel Ash, David J and Kevin Haskins from Bauhaus, Love and Rockets and the Bubblemen. Good God's Urge also marked a reunion of ex-Jane's Addiction guitarist Dave Navarro, who played guitar on the album track "Freeway." The song also featured Navarro's Red Hot Chili Peppers bandmate, Flea.

Farrell's then-girlfriend, Christine Cagle, appeared on the album cover.

Porno for Pyros went on a hiatus shortly after the tour (featuring Watt on bass) promoting the album's release due to guitarist Peter DiStefano cancer diagnosis.  They were set to reform in 2019 to perform at singer Farrell's birthday celebration, but those plans were scrapped due to the COVID Pandemic.  The Good God's Urge-era lineup of Farrell, DiStefano, Perkins, and Watt performed in 2020 as part of a Lollapalooza webcast, and in 2022 as part of the Welcome to Rockville festival.

Critical reception

Trouser Press wrote that "while he helpfully turns the attack down to an alluringly cool semi-acoustic breeze on parts of Good God’s Urge, Farrell can’t improve his obnoxious personality, which renders the album another love-it/hate- it proposition." The New York Times wrote that "the music gets atmospheric, experimental and interesting." CMJ New Music Monthly called the record "more pleasantly stoned than the first album."

Track listing

Personnel

Band
 Perry Farrell: Vocals, percussion, samples, harp, keyboards
 Peter DiStefano: Guitars, samples, backing vocals
 Martyn LeNoble: Bass (tracks 3, 4, 5, 7, 8, 10)
 Stephen Perkins: Drums, percussion, samples, backing vocals

Additional musicians
 Thomas Johnson: Samples and sounds, keyboards (track 2)
 David J: Bass (1)
 Mike Watt: Bass (2, 6)
 Flea: Bass (9)
 Daniel Ash : Guitar (1)
 Kevin Haskins: Samples (1)
 Dave Navarro: Guitar intro (9)
 Matt Hyde: Intro slide guitar (3), samples (8), slide guitar (10)
 Lili Haydn: Violin (2)
 Ralf Rickert: Trumpet (2)
 Leo Chelyapov: Clarinet (7)
 John Flannery: Space guitar intro and chorus (9), backing vocals and trash can (6)
 Josh "Bagel" Klassman: Backing vocals (9)
 Christine Cagle: Backing vocals (6, 9)
 Shawn London: Backing Vocals (6)
 Kimberly Juarez: Backing Vocals (2)

Production
 Dave Collins - mastering

Charts

References

Porno for Pyros albums
1996 albums
Warner Records albums
Albums produced by Matt Hyde
Albums recorded at Shangri-La (recording studio)